Kevin Glen Weisman (born December 29, 1970) is an American film, television and stage actor.  Career highlights thus far include his lauded portrayal of Marshall Flinkman on the critically acclaimed J.J. Abrams  television series Alias, which aired for five seasons (2001–2006) on ABC, Kives on the HBO television series and movie Hello Ladies (2013–14), Ray Spiewack for three seasons on the CBS television series Scorpion, Dr. Maynard on the NBC television series The Blacklist, and Ned Berring in season one of the David E. Kelley series Goliath starring Billy Bob Thornton. In 2017, Kevin began a three-year stint as Dale Yorkes on the Hulu series Marvel's Runaways.

Early life
Weisman was born to a Jewish family in Los Angeles, California.  He pursued acting at a young age, first appearing as The Professor in a fourth grade production of Gilligan's Island. While at Taft High School In Woodland Hills, California (a suburb of Los Angeles), Kevin participated in local drama festivals in and around the Los Angeles area (DTASC), performing work from the likes of William Shakespeare and Neil Simon. He went on to receive a BA from the University of California, Los Angeles School of Theater, Film and Television, and then to further his study of the craft of acting at New York's prestigious Circle in the Square Theatre. Weisman is a founding member of the mutli-award-winning Los Angeles based theater troupe, Buffalo Nights Theater Company

Stage credits
In 2015, Weisman was awarded a Lead Actor Award (Stage Raw) for his work as Francois Villon in Murray Mednick's Villon, which premiered at the Odyssey Theater in Los Angeles. The show was produced by the Padua Playwrights.

Prior Los Angeles productions include tackling the role of frustrated writer Arthur Kellogg in Jaime Pachino's 2012 West Coast premiere of The Return to Morality with the Production Company in Los Angeles.

A founding member of Buffalo Nights Theatre Company, Weisman has produced, directed and acted in a over 25 productions in and around the Los Angeles area. Highlights include the title role of Anatol in Arthur Schnitzler's Anatol, and as Los Angeles philanthropist and convicted felon Griffith J. Griffith in the award- winning Crazy Drunk at the John Anson Ford Theatre in Los Angeles. Other notable productions with the company include Jean Giraudoux's Apollo of Bellac (LA Weekly Production of the Year); Madman and the Nun, The Firebugs, Suburban Motel, Ethan Lipton's Hope on the Range, Arthur Miller's Incident at Vichy, Oscar Wilde's Salome, and the West Coast Premiere of Jonathan Marc Sherman's Sophistry.

Other theatrical turns include stand out performances at The in Odyssey Theater and the Mark Taper Forum in masterworks such as 'Tis Pity She's a Whore, The Greeks (Ovation Award for Production of the Year) and The Goldoni Trilogy . Weisman has also treaded the boards at the La Mirada Theatre for the Performing Arts, where he appeared as Uncle Louie In Neil Simon's Lost in Yonkers, and as Gabe in Donald Margulies' Pulitzer Prize winning play, Dinner with Friends, directed by Brian Kite.

Other work
Internationally known for his portrayal of Marshall J. Flinkman for five seasons on the critically acclaimed ABC series Alias, Weisman was later cast as series regular, Kives, in the 2013 Stephen Merchant/HBO project Hello Ladies, in which TV.com named Kevin one of the "season's best new characters". In 2015, Weisman joined the cast of the David E. Kelley Amazon series, Goliath, as agoraphobic recluse Ned Berring.

Later that year, Weisman appeared as Stevie in a first-season episode of AMC's Better Call Saul entitled Hero, and landed the recurring role of Dr. Jeffrey Maynard on NBC's hit drama, The Blacklist. That same year, Kevin was tapped to play bon vivant Ray Spiewack on the CBS drama Scorpion, which resulted in a raucous three season arc. Other fan favorites include the recurring Assistant DA, Todd Erlich, on TNT's Perception, and a memorable turn as Anson Stokes in The X-Files (Season 7) episode Je Souhaite, written and directed by Vince Gilligan.
In 2006, director Kevin Smith called on Weisman to appear in his now cult classic film, Clerks II, and in 2010, director Rob Reiner hired him to play Aidan Quinn's character's younger, mentally challenged brother, Daniel Baker, in Flipped. In 2012, Weisman played the recurring role of the mysterious Mr. Blonde, opposite Jason Issacs in the NBC show Awake.  Other television work includes the recurring role of the deferential minion, Dreg, on Joss Whedon's Buffy the Vampire Slayer, Roswell, ER, Frasier, JAG, The Pretender, The Drew Carey Show, Just Shoot Me, Chuck, Miami Medical, Ghost Whisperer, Moonlight, Fairly Legal, Felicity, Human Target, The Forgotten, The Glades, CSI, CSI: Miami, CSI: New York, Fringe, and October Road. Additional film work includes The Rock, Gone in 60 Seconds, Space Buddies, Unicorn City, Bending The Rules, and Undocumented.

In 2004, Weisman produced and acted in the independent feature film The Illusion, directed by Emmy Award winner Michael Goorjian, and starring Hollywood legend Kirk Douglas. Illusion won the "Best Screenplay" award at the 12th Annual Hamptons International Film Festival, and was an official selection of the 16th Annual Palm Springs International Film Festival. An avid poker player, Kevin appeared on Bravo's Celebrity Poker Showdown. A drummer since age 12, Weisman has kept the back-beat for the band Trainwreck, with Kyle Gass of Tenacious D (with Jack Black).

Quite prolific in the world of voice-over, Weisman's soul soothing vocal timbre has been heard on radio and television ads for such companies as Nike, Coke, and ATT. He was also the voice of Honda cars and trucks for over three years.

Weisman has appeared on both the Entertainment Weekly "Must List" (2006), and on the TV Guide "Top 10 Scene Stealers" list a total of three times. He has been nominated for a Teen Choice Award twice for his work on Alias (best side-kick), and Marvel's Runaways once (Best Drama). He and the cast of Alias took home a People's Choice award after their first season for Best New Show. In 2002, Kevin and the rest of the Alias cast were nominated for a Best Drama Golden Globe Award.

In 2021, Weisman started the 'Did We Do It' podcast alongside former Trainwreck bandmate Kyle Gass.

Philanthropy
In 2004, Weisman was a participant in the first-ever national television advertising campaign supporting donations to Jewish federations. The program featured "film and television personalities celebrating their Jewish heritage and promoting charitable giving to the Jewish community". Additional charities Kevin is actively involved in include The Children's Defense Fund, the DMD Fund (supporting the fight against Duchenne Muscular Dystrophy), Save The Children, Broadway Cares,  Wheels For Humanity, Bet Tzedek (a non-profit law-firm that provides free legal services to low-income, disabled and elderly residents of Los Angeles Country), The Melanoma Research Foundation, and The Clear View Treatment Center, which provides a residential treatment program for adolescent boys who have been neglected, abused and abandoned.

Personal life
In 2005, Weisman married Jodi Tanowitz, a preschool teacher, in a Jewish ceremony. He has two children, Maya Rose Weisman (born 2006) and Ellie Samantha Weisman (born 2008). The couple divorced in 2011, but remain committed to co-parenting their two daughters together. Kevin currently resides in Los Angeles in the Hollywood Hills (not far from his childhood home in Encino), and has three sisters. He has been practicing yoga for over twenty years, and is a vegan.

Filmography

Television

Film

References

External links
Official site

Kevin Weisman at the All Alias Guide

1970 births
Living people
20th-century American male actors
21st-century American male actors
Male actors from Los Angeles
American male film actors
American male television actors
UCLA Film School alumni
Circle in the Square Theatre School alumni
Jewish American male actors
Trainwreck with Kyle Gass members
21st-century American Jews